Tobati, or Yotafa, is an Austronesian language spoken in Jayapura Bay in Papua province, Indonesia. It was once thought to be a Papuan language. Notably, Tobati displays a very rare object–subject–verb word order.

Phonology

However, it does not behave as a stop (see below).

Tobati has a five-vowel system of /    /, realized as /    / in closed syllables.

Phonotactics
Tobati permits three consonants in the onset, and at most a single consonant or a nasal-stop cluster in the coda.

Nasal-stop clusters only permit a nasal and a stop of the same PoA. For the  sequence,  becomes dental [].

References

Languages of western New Guinea
Sarmi–Jayapura languages
Severely endangered languages